Wolfgang Amadeus Mozart (27 January 17565 December 1791), baptised as Joannes Chrysostomus Wolfgangus Theophilus Mozart, was a prolific and influential composer of the Classical period. Despite his short life, his rapid pace of composition resulted in more than 800 works of virtually every genre of his time. Many of these compositions are acknowledged as pinnacles of the symphonic, concertante, chamber, operatic, and choral repertoire. Mozart is widely regarded as among the greatest composers in the history of Western music, with his music admired for its "melodic beauty, its formal elegance and its richness of harmony and texture".

Born in Salzburg, then in the Holy Roman Empire, Mozart showed prodigious ability from his earliest childhood. Already competent on keyboard and violin, he composed from the age of five and performed before European royalty. His father took him on a grand tour of Europe and then three trips to Italy. At 17, he was a musician at the Salzburg court but grew restless and travelled in search of a better position.

While visiting Vienna in 1781, Mozart was dismissed from his Salzburg position. He stayed in Vienna, where he achieved fame but little financial security. During his final years there, he composed many of his best-known symphonies, concertos, and operas. His Requiem was largely unfinished by the time of his death at the age of 35, the circumstances of which are uncertain and much mythologized.

Life and career

Early life

Family and childhood

Wolfgang Amadeus Mozart was born on 27 January 1756 to Leopold Mozart (1719–1787) and Anna Maria, née Pertl (1720–1778), at Getreidegasse 9 in Salzburg. Salzburg was the capital of the Archbishopric of Salzburg, an ecclesiastic principality in the Holy Roman Empire (today in Austria). He was the youngest of seven children, five of whom died in infancy. His elder sister was Maria Anna Mozart (1751–1829), nicknamed "Nannerl". Mozart was baptised the day after his birth, at St. Rupert's Cathedral in Salzburg. The baptismal record gives his name in Latinized form, as Joannes Chrysostomus Wolfgangus Theophilus Mozart. He generally called himself "Wolfgang Amadè Mozart" as an adult, but his name had many variants.

Leopold Mozart, a native of Augsburg, then an Imperial Free City in the Holy Roman Empire, was a minor composer and an experienced teacher. In 1743, he was appointed as the fourth violinist in the musical establishment of Count Leopold Anton von Firmian, the ruling Prince-Archbishop of Salzburg. Four years later, he married Anna Maria in Salzburg. Leopold became the orchestra's deputy Kapellmeister in 1763. During the year of his son's birth, Leopold published a violin textbook, Versuch einer gründlichen Violinschule, which achieved success.

When Nannerl was 7, she began keyboard lessons with her father, while her three-year-old brother looked on. Years later, after her brother's death, she reminisced:
He often spent much time at the clavier, picking out thirds, which he was ever striking, and his pleasure showed that it sounded good.... In the fourth year of his age his father, for a game as it were, began to teach him a few minuets and pieces at the clavier.... He could play it faultlessly and with the greatest delicacy, and keeping exactly in time.... At the age of five, he was already composing little pieces, which he played to his father who wrote them down.

These early pieces, K. 1–5, were recorded in the Nannerl Notenbuch. There is some scholarly debate about whether Mozart was four or five years old when he created his first musical compositions, though there is little doubt that Mozart composed his first three pieces of music within a few weeks of each other: K. 1a, 1b, and 1c.

In his early years, Wolfgang's father was his only teacher. Along with music, he taught his children languages and academic subjects. Solomon notes that, while Leopold was a devoted teacher to his children, there is evidence that Mozart was keen to progress beyond what he was taught. His first ink-spattered composition and his precocious efforts with the violin were of his initiative and came as a surprise to Leopold, who eventually gave up composing when his son's musical talents became evident.

1762–73: Travel

While Wolfgang was young, his family made several European journeys in which he and Nannerl performed as child prodigies. These began with an exhibition in 1762 at the court of Prince-elector Maximilian III of Bavaria in Munich, and at the Imperial Courts in Vienna and Prague. A long concert tour followed, spanning three and a half years, taking the family to the courts of Munich, Mannheim, Paris, London, Dover, The Hague, Amsterdam, Utrecht, Mechelen and again to Paris, and back home via Zurich, Donaueschingen, and Munich. During this trip, Wolfgang met many musicians and acquainted himself with the works of other composers. A particularly significant influence was Johann Christian Bach, whom he visited in London in 1764 and 1765. When he was eight years old, Mozart wrote his first symphony, most of which was probably transcribed by his father.

The family trips were often challenging, and travel conditions were primitive. They had to wait for invitations and reimbursement from the nobility, and they endured long, near-fatal illnesses far from home: first Leopold (London, summer 1764), then both children (The Hague, autumn 1765). The family again went to Vienna in late 1767 and remained there until December 1768.

After one year in Salzburg, Leopold and Wolfgang set off for Italy, leaving Anna Maria and Nannerl at home. This tour lasted from December 1769 to March 1771. As with earlier journeys, Leopold wanted to display his son's abilities as a performer and a rapidly maturing composer. Wolfgang met Josef Mysliveček and Giovanni Battista Martini in Bologna and was accepted as a member of the famous Accademia Filarmonica. There exists a myth, according to which, while in Rome, he heard Gregorio Allegri's Miserere twice in performance in the Sistine Chapel. Allegedly, he subsequently wrote it out from memory, thus producing the "first unauthorized copy of this closely guarded property of the Vatican". However, both origin and plausibility of this account are disputed.

In Milan, Mozart wrote the opera Mitridate, re di Ponto (1770), which was performed with success. This led to further opera commissions. He returned with his father twice to Milan (August–December 1771; October 1772March 1773) for the composition and premieres of Ascanio in Alba (1771) and Lucio Silla (1772). Leopold hoped these visits would result in a professional appointment for his son, and indeed ruling Archduke Ferdinand contemplated hiring Mozart, but owing to his mother Empress Maria Theresa's reluctance to employ "useless people", the matter was dropped and Leopold's hopes were never realized. Toward the end of the journey, Mozart wrote the solo motet Exsultate, jubilate, K.165.

1773–77: Employment at the Salzburg court

After finally returning with his father from Italy on 13 March 1773, Mozart was employed as a court musician by the ruler of Salzburg, Prince-Archbishop Hieronymus Colloredo. The composer had many friends and admirers in Salzburg and had the opportunity to work in many genres, including symphonies, sonatas, string quartets, masses, serenades, and a few minor operas. Between April and December 1775, Mozart developed an enthusiasm for violin concertos, producing a series of five (the only ones he ever wrote), which steadily increased in their musical sophistication. The last three—K. 216, K. 218, K. 219—are now staples of the repertoire. In 1776, he turned his efforts to piano concertos, culminating in the E concerto K. 271 of early 1777, considered by critics to be a breakthrough work.

Despite these artistic successes, Mozart grew increasingly discontented with Salzburg and redoubled his efforts to find a position elsewhere. One reason was his low salary, 150 florins a year; Mozart longed to compose operas, and Salzburg provided only rare occasions for these. The situation worsened in 1775 when the court theatre was closed, especially since the other theatre in Salzburg was primarily reserved for visiting troupes.

Two long expeditions in search of work interrupted this long Salzburg stay. Mozart and his father visited Vienna from 14 July to 26 September 1773, and Munich from 6December 1774 to March 1775. Neither visit was successful, though the Munich journey resulted in a popular success with the premiere of Mozart's opera La finta giardiniera.

1777–78: Journey to Paris

In August 1777, Mozart resigned his position at Salzburg and on 23 September ventured out once more in search of employment, with visits to Augsburg, Mannheim, Paris, and Munich.

Mozart became acquainted with members of the famous orchestra in Mannheim, the best in Europe at the time. He also fell in love with Aloysia Weber, one of four daughters of a musical family. There were prospects of employment in Mannheim, but they came to nothing, and Mozart left for Paris on 14 March 1778 to continue his search. One of his letters from Paris hints at a possible post as an organist at Versailles, but Mozart was not interested in such an appointment. He fell into debt and took to pawning valuables. The nadir of the visit occurred when Mozart's mother was taken ill and died on 3July 1778. There had been delays in calling a doctor—probably, according to Halliwell, because of a lack of funds. Mozart stayed with Melchior Grimm at Marquise d'Épinay's residence, 5 rue de la Chaussée-d'Antin.

While Mozart was in Paris, his father was pursuing opportunities of employment for him in Salzburg. With the support of the local nobility, Mozart was offered a post as court organist and concertmaster. The annual salary was 450 florins, but he was reluctant to accept. By that time, relations between Grimm and Mozart had cooled, and Mozart moved out. After leaving Paris in September 1778 for Strasbourg, he lingered in Mannheim and Munich, still hoping to obtain an appointment outside Salzburg. In Munich, he again encountered Aloysia, now a very successful singer, but she was no longer interested in him. Mozart finally returned to Salzburg on 15 January 1779 and took up his new appointment, but his discontent with Salzburg remained undiminished.

Among the better-known works which Mozart wrote on the Paris journey are the A minor piano sonata, K. 310/300d, the "Paris" Symphony (No. 31), which were performed in Paris on 12 and 18 June 1778; and the Concerto for Flute and Harp in C major, K. 299/297c.

Vienna

1781: Departure

In January 1781, Mozart's opera Idomeneo premiered with "considerable success" in Munich. The following March, Mozart was summoned to Vienna, where his employer, Archbishop Colloredo, was attending the celebrations for the accession of Joseph II to the Austrian throne. For Colloredo, this was simply a matter of wanting his musical servant to be at hand (Mozart indeed was required to dine in Colloredo's establishment with the valets and cooks). He planned a bigger career as he continued in the archbishop's service; for example, he wrote to his father:
My main goal right now is to meet the emperor in some agreeable fashion, I am absolutely determined he . I would be so happy if I could whip through my opera for him and then play a fugue or two, for that's what he likes.

Mozart did indeed soon meet the Emperor, who eventually was to support his career substantially with commissions and a part-time position.

In the same letter to his father just quoted, Mozart outlined his plans to participate as a soloist in the concerts of the Tonkünstler-Societät, a prominent benefit concert series; this plan as well came to pass after the local nobility prevailed on Colloredo to drop his opposition.

Colloredo's wish to prevent Mozart from performing outside his establishment was in other cases carried through, raising the composer's anger; one example was a chance to perform before the Emperor at Countess Thun's for a fee equal to half of his yearly Salzburg salary.

The quarrel with the archbishop came to a head in May: Mozart attempted to resign and was refused. The following month, permission was granted, but in a grossly insulting way: the composer was dismissed literally "with a kick in the arse", administered by the archbishop's steward, Count Arco. Mozart decided to settle in Vienna as a freelance performer and composer.

The quarrel with Colloredo was more difficult for Mozart because his father sided against him. Hoping fervently that he would obediently follow Colloredo back to Salzburg, Mozart's father exchanged intense letters with his son, urging him to be reconciled with their employer. Mozart passionately defended his intention to pursue an independent career in Vienna. The debate ended when Mozart was dismissed by the archbishop, freeing himself both of his employer and of his father's demands to return. Solomon characterizes Mozart's resignation as a "revolutionary step" that significantly altered the course of his life.

Early years

Mozart's new career in Vienna began well. He often performed as a pianist, notably in a competition before the Emperor with Muzio Clementi on 24 December 1781, and he soon "had established himself as the finest keyboard player in Vienna". He also prospered as a composer, and in 1782 completed the opera Die Entführung aus dem Serail ("The Abduction from the Seraglio"), which premiered on 16 July 1782 and achieved considerable success. The work was soon being performed "throughout German-speaking Europe", and thoroughly established Mozart's reputation as a composer.

Near the height of his quarrels with Colloredo, Mozart moved in with the Weber family, who had moved to Vienna from Mannheim. The family's father, Fridolin, had died, and the Webers were now taking in lodgers to make ends meet.

Marriage and children

After failing to win the hand of Aloysia Weber, who was now married to the actor and artist Joseph Lange, Mozart's interest shifted to the third daughter of the family, Constanze.

The courtship did not go entirely smoothly; surviving correspondence indicates that Mozart and Constanze briefly separated in April 1782. Mozart faced a challenging task in getting his father's permission for the marriage. The couple were finally married on 4August 1782 in St. Stephen's Cathedral, the day before his father's consenting letter arrived in the mail.

The couple had six children, of whom only two survived infancy:
 Raimund Leopold (17 June19 August 1783)
 Karl Thomas Mozart (21 September 178431 October 1858)
 Johann Thomas Leopold (18 October15 November 1786)
 Theresia Constanzia Adelheid Friedericke Maria Anna (27 December 178729 June 1788)
 Anna Maria (died soon after birth, 16 November 1789)
 Franz Xaver Wolfgang Mozart (26 July 179129 July 1844)

1782–87

In 1782 and 1783, Mozart became intimately acquainted with the work of Johann Sebastian Bach and George Frideric Handel as a result of the influence of Gottfried van Swieten, who owned many manuscripts of the Baroque masters. Mozart's study of these scores inspired compositions in Baroque style and later influenced his musical language, for example in fugal passages in Die Zauberflöte ("The Magic Flute") and the finale of Symphony No. 41.

In 1783, Mozart and his wife visited his family in Salzburg. His father and sister were cordially polite to Constanze, but the visit prompted the composition of one of Mozart's great liturgical pieces, the Mass in C minor. Though not completed, it was premiered in Salzburg, with Constanze singing a solo part.

Mozart met Joseph Haydn in Vienna around 1784, and the two composers became friends. When Haydn visited Vienna, they sometimes played together in an impromptu string quartet. Mozart's six quartets dedicated to Haydn (K. 387, K. 421, K. 428, K. 458, K. 464, and K. 465) date from the period 1782 to 1785, and are judged to be a response to Haydn's Opus 33 set from 1781. Haydn wrote, "posterity will not see such a talent again in 100 years" and in 1785 told Mozart's father: "I tell you before God, and as an honest man, your son is the greatest composer known to me by person and repute, he has taste and what is more the greatest skill in composition."

From 1782 to 1785 Mozart mounted concerts with himself as a soloist, presenting three or four new piano concertos in each season. Since space in the theatres was scarce, he booked unconventional venues: a large room in the Trattnerhof apartment building, and the ballroom of the Mehlgrube restaurant. The concerts were very popular, and his concertos premiered there are still firm fixtures in his repertoire. Solomon writes that during this period, Mozart created "a harmonious connection between an eager composer-performer and a delighted audience, which was given the opportunity of witnessing the transformation and perfection of a major musical genre".

With substantial returns from his concerts and elsewhere, Mozart and his wife adopted a more luxurious lifestyle. They moved to an expensive apartment, with a yearly rent of 460 florins. Mozart bought a fine fortepiano from Anton Walter for about 900 florins, and a billiard table for about 300. The Mozarts sent their son Karl Thomas to an expensive boarding school and kept servants. During this period Mozart saved little of his income.

On 14 December 1784, Mozart became a Freemason, admitted to the lodge Zur Wohltätigkeit ("Beneficence"). Freemasonry played an essential role in the remainder of Mozart's life: he attended meetings, a number of his friends were Masons, and on various occasions, he composed Masonic music, e.g. the Maurerische Trauermusik.

1786–87: Return to opera

Despite the great success of Die Entführung aus dem Serail, Mozart did little operatic writing for the next four years, producing only two unfinished works and the one-act Der Schauspieldirektor. He focused instead on his career as a piano soloist and writer of concertos. Around the end of 1785, Mozart moved away from keyboard writing and began his famous operatic collaboration with the librettist Lorenzo Da Ponte. The year 1786 saw the successful premiere of The Marriage of Figaro in Vienna. Its reception in Prague later in the year was even warmer, and this led to a second collaboration with Da Ponte: the opera Don Giovanni, which premiered in October 1787 to acclaim in Prague, but less success in Vienna during 1788. The two are among Mozart's most famous works and are mainstays of operatic repertoire today, though at their premieres their musical complexity caused difficulty both for listeners and for performers. These developments were not witnessed by Mozart's father, who had died on 28 May 1787.

In December 1787, Mozart finally obtained a steady post under aristocratic patronage. Emperor Joseph II appointed him as his "chamber composer", a post that had fallen vacant the previous month on the death of Gluck. It was a part-time appointment, paying just 800 florins per year, and required Mozart only to compose dances for the annual balls in the Redoutensaal (see Mozart and dance). This modest income became important to Mozart when hard times arrived. Court records show that Joseph aimed to keep the esteemed composer from leaving Vienna in pursuit of better prospects.

In 1787, the young Ludwig van Beethoven spent several weeks in Vienna, hoping to study with Mozart. No reliable records survive to indicate whether the two composers ever met.

Later years

1788–90

Toward the end of the decade, Mozart's circumstances worsened. Around 1786 he had ceased to appear frequently in public concerts, and his income shrank. This was a difficult time for musicians in Vienna because of the Austro-Turkish War: both the general level of prosperity and the ability of the aristocracy to support music had declined. In 1788, Mozart saw a 66% decline in his income compared to his best years in 1781.

By mid-1788, Mozart and his family had moved from central Vienna to the suburb of Alsergrund. Although it has been suggested that Mozart aimed to reduce his rental expenses by moving to a suburb, as he wrote in his letter to Michael von Puchberg, Mozart had not reduced his expenses but merely increased the housing space at his disposal. Mozart began to borrow money, most often from his friend and fellow mason Puchberg; "a pitiful sequence of letters pleading for loans" survives. Maynard Solomon and others have suggested that Mozart was suffering from depression, and it seems his musical output slowed. Major works of the period include the last three symphonies (Nos. 39, 40, and 41, all from 1788), and the last of the three Da Ponte operas, Così fan tutte, premiered in 1790.

Around this time, Mozart made some long journeys hoping to improve his fortunes, visiting Leipzig, Dresden, and Berlin in the spring of 1789, and Frankfurt, Mannheim, and other German cities in 1790.

1791

Mozart's last year was, until his final illness struck, a time of high productivity—and by some accounts, one of personal recovery. He composed a great deal, including some of his most admired works: the opera The Magic Flute; the final piano concerto (K. 595 in B); the Clarinet Concerto K. 622; the last in his series of string quintets (K. 614 in E); the motet Ave verum corpus K. 618; and the unfinished Requiem K. 626.

Mozart's financial situation, a source of anxiety in 1790, finally began to improve. Although the evidence is inconclusive, it appears that wealthy patrons in Hungary and Amsterdam pledged annuities to Mozart in return for the occasional composition. He is thought to have benefited from the sale of dance music written in his role as Imperial chamber composer. Mozart no longer borrowed large sums from Puchberg and began to pay off his debts.

He experienced great satisfaction in the public success of some of his works, notably The Magic Flute (which was performed several times in the short period between its premiere and Mozart's death) and the Little Masonic Cantata K. 623, premiered on 17 November 1791.

Final illness and death

Mozart fell ill while in Prague for the premiere, on 6September 1791, of his opera La clemenza di Tito, which was written in that same year on commission for Emperor Leopold II's coronation festivities. He continued his professional functions for some time and conducted the premiere of The Magic Flute on 30 September. His health deteriorated on 20 November, at which point he became bedridden, suffering from swelling, pain, and vomiting.

Mozart was nursed in his final days by his wife and her youngest sister, and was attended by the family doctor, Thomas Franz Closset. He was mentally occupied with the task of finishing his Requiem, but the evidence that he dictated passages to his student Franz Xaver Süssmayr is minimal.

The New Grove describes his funeral:
Mozart was interred in a common grave, in accordance with contemporary Viennese custom, at the St. Marx Cemetery outside the city on 7December. If, as later reports say, no mourners attended, that too is consistent with Viennese burial customs at the time; later Otto Jahn (1856) wrote that Salieri, Süssmayr, van Swieten and two other musicians were present. The tale of a storm and snow is false; the day was calm and mild.

The expression "common grave" refers to neither a communal grave nor a pauper's grave, but an individual grave for a member of the common people (i.e., not the aristocracy). Common graves were subject to excavation after ten years; the graves of aristocrats were not.

The cause of Mozart's death is not known with certainty. The official record of hitziges Frieselfieber ("severe miliary fever", referring to a rash that looks like millet seeds) is more a symptomatic description than a diagnosis. Researchers have suggested more than a hundred causes of death, including acute rheumatic fever, streptococcal infection, trichinosis, influenza, mercury poisoning, and a rare kidney ailment.

Mozart's modest funeral did not reflect his standing with the public as a composer; memorial services and concerts in Vienna and Prague were well-attended. Indeed, in the period immediately after his death, his reputation rose substantially. Solomon describes an "unprecedented wave of enthusiasm" for his work; biographies were written first by Schlichtegroll, Niemetschek, and Nissen, and publishers vied to produce complete editions of his works.

Appearance and character

Mozart's physical appearance was described by tenor Michael Kelly in his Reminiscences: "a remarkably small man, very thin and pale, with a profusion of fine, fair hair of which he was rather vain". His early biographer Niemetschek wrote, "there was nothing special about [his] physique.... He was small and his countenance, except for his large intense eyes, gave no signs of his genius." His facial complexion was pitted, a reminder of his childhood case of smallpox. Of his voice, his wife later wrote that it "was a tenor, rather soft in speaking and delicate in singing, but when anything excited him, or it became necessary to exert it, it was both powerful and energetic."

He loved elegant clothing. Kelly remembered him at a rehearsal:  was on the stage with his crimson pelisse and gold-laced cocked hat, giving the time of the music to the orchestra." Based on pictures that researchers were able to find of Mozart, he seemed to wear a white wig for most of his formal occasions—researchers of the Salzburg Mozarteum declared that only one of his fourteen portraits they had found showed him without his wig.

Mozart usually worked long and hard, finishing compositions at a tremendous pace as deadlines approached. He often made sketches and drafts; unlike Beethoven's, these are mostly not preserved, as his wife sought to destroy them after his death.

Mozart lived at the center of the Viennese musical world, and knew a significant number and variety of people: fellow musicians, theatrical performers, fellow Salzburgers, and aristocrats, including some acquaintance with Emperor Joseph II. Solomon considers his three closest friends to have been Gottfried von Jacquin, Count August Hatzfeld, and Sigmund Barisani; others included his elder colleague Joseph Haydn, singers Franz Xaver Gerl and Benedikt Schack, and the horn player Joseph Leutgeb. Leutgeb and Mozart carried on a curious kind of friendly mockery, often with Leutgeb as the butt of Mozart's practical jokes.

He enjoyed billiards, dancing, and kept pets, including a canary, a starling, a dog, and a horse for recreational riding. He had a startling fondness for scatological humour, which is preserved in his surviving letters, notably those written to his cousin Maria Anna Thekla Mozart around 1777–1778, and in his correspondence with his sister and parents. Mozart also wrote scatological music, a series of canons that he sang with his friends. Mozart was raised a Catholic and remained a devout member of the Church throughout his life.

Works, musical style, and innovations

Style

Mozart's music, like Haydn's, stands as an archetype of the Classical style. At the time he began composing, European music was dominated by the style galant, a reaction against the highly evolved intricacy of the Baroque. Progressively, and in large part at the hands of Mozart himself, the contrapuntal complexities of the late Baroque emerged once more, moderated and disciplined by new forms, and adapted to a new aesthetic and social milieu. Mozart was a versatile composer, and wrote in every major genre, including symphony, opera, the solo concerto, chamber music including string quartet and string quintet, and the piano sonata. These forms were not new, but Mozart advanced their technical sophistication and emotional reach. He almost single-handedly developed and popularized the Classical piano concerto. He wrote a great deal of religious music, including large-scale masses, as well as dances, divertimenti, serenades, and other forms of light entertainment.

The central traits of the Classical style are all present in Mozart's music. Clarity, balance, and transparency are the hallmarks of his work, but simplistic notions of its delicacy mask the exceptional power of his finest masterpieces, such as the Piano Concerto No. 24 in C minor, K. 491; the Symphony No. 40 in G minor, K. 550; and the opera Don Giovanni. Charles Rosen makes the point forcefully:

It is only through recognizing the violence and sensuality at the center of Mozart's work that we can make a start towards a comprehension of his structures and an insight into his magnificence. In a paradoxical way, Schumann's superficial characterization of the G minor Symphony can help us to see Mozart's daemon more steadily. In all of Mozart's supreme expressions of suffering and terror, there is something shockingly voluptuous.

During his last decade, Mozart frequently exploited chromatic harmony. A notable instance is his String Quartet in C major, K. 465 (1785), whose introduction abounds in chromatic suspensions, giving rise to the work's nickname, the "Dissonance" quartet.

Mozart had a gift for absorbing and adapting the valuable features of others' music. His travels helped in the forging of a unique compositional language. In London as a child, he met J. C. Bach and heard his music. In Paris, Mannheim, and Vienna he met with other compositional influences, as well as the avant-garde capabilities of the Mannheim orchestra. In Italy, he encountered the Italian overture and opera buffa, both of which deeply affected the evolution of his practice. In London and Italy, the galant style was in the ascendent: simple, light music with a mania for cadencing; an emphasis on tonic, dominant, and subdominant to the exclusion of other harmonies; symmetrical phrases; and clearly articulated partitions in the overall form of movements. Some of Mozart's early symphonies are Italian overtures, with three movements running into each other; many are homotonal (all three movements having the same key signature, with the slow middle movement being in the relative minor). Others mimic the works of J. C. Bach, and others show the simple rounded binary forms turned out by Viennese composers.

As Mozart matured, he progressively incorporated more features adapted from the Baroque. For example, the Symphony No. 29 in A major K. 201 has a contrapuntal main theme in its first movement, and experimentation with irregular phrase lengths. Some of his quartets from 1773 have fugal finales, probably influenced by Haydn, who had included three such finales in his recently published Opus 20 set. The influence of the Sturm und Drang ("Storm and Stress") period in music, with its brief foreshadowing of the Romantic era, is evident in the music of both composers at that time. Mozart's Symphony No. 25 in G minor K. 183 is another excellent example.

Mozart would sometimes switch his focus between operas and instrumental music. He produced operas in each of the prevailing styles: opera buffa, such as The Marriage of Figaro, Don Giovanni, and Così fan tutte; opera seria, such as Idomeneo; and Singspiel, of which Die Zauberflöte is the most famous example by any composer. In his later operas, he employed subtle changes in instrumentation, orchestral texture, and tone colour, for emotional depth and to mark dramatic shifts. Here his advances in opera and instrumental composing interacted: his increasingly sophisticated use of the orchestra in the symphonies and concertos influenced his operatic orchestration, and his developing subtlety in using the orchestra to psychological effect in his operas was in turn reflected in his later non-operatic compositions.

Köchel catalogue

For unambiguous identification of works by Mozart, a Köchel catalogue number is used. This is a unique number assigned, in regular chronological order, to every one of his known works. A work is referenced by the abbreviation "K." or "KV" followed by this number. The first edition of the catalogue was completed in 1862 by Ludwig von Köchel. It has since been repeatedly updated, as scholarly research improves knowledge of the dates and authenticity of individual works.

Instruments
Although some of Mozart's early pieces were written for harpsichord, he also became acquainted in his early years with pianos made by Regensburg builder . Later when Mozart was visiting Augsburg, he was impressed by Stein pianos and shared this in a letter to his father. On 22 October 1777, Mozart had premiered his triple-piano concerto, K. 242, on instruments provided by Stein. The Augsburg Cathedral organist Demmler was playing the first, Mozart the second and Stein the third part. In 1783 when living in Vienna he purchased an instrument by Walter. Leopold Mozart confirmed the attachment which Mozart had with his Walter fortepiano: "It is impossible to describe the hustle and bustle. Your brother's pianoforte has been moved at least twelve times from his house to the theatre or to someone else's house."

Influence

His most famous pupil, whom the Mozarts took into their Vienna home for two years as a child, was probably Johann Nepomuk Hummel, a transitional figure between the Classical and Romantic eras. More important is the influence Mozart had on composers of later generations. Ever since the surge in his reputation after his death, studying his scores has been a standard part of classical musicians' training.

Ludwig van Beethoven, Mozart's junior by fifteen years, was deeply influenced by his work, with which he was acquainted as a teenager. He is thought to have performed Mozart's operas while playing in the court orchestra at Bonn and travelled to Vienna in 1787 hoping to study with the older composer. Some of Beethoven's works have direct models in comparable works by Mozart, and he wrote cadenzas (WoO 58) to Mozart's D minor piano concerto K. 466.

Composers have paid homage to Mozart by writing sets of variations on his themes. Beethoven wrote four such sets (Op. 66, WoO 28, WoO 40, WoO 46). Others include Fernando Sor's Introduction and Variations on a Theme by Mozart (1821), Mikhail Glinka's Variations on a Theme from Mozart's Opera The Magic Flute (1822), Frédéric Chopin's Variations on "Là ci darem la mano" from Don Giovanni (1827), and Max Reger's Variations and Fugue on a Theme by Mozart (1914), based on the variation theme in the piano sonata K. 331. Pyotr Ilyich Tchaikovsky, who revered Mozart, wrote his Orchestral Suite No. 4 in G, Mozartiana (1887), as a tribute to him.

References

Notes

Citations

Sources

Further reading
See  for an extensive bibliography

 
 Baumol, William J., and Hilda Baumol. "On the economics of musical composition in Mozart's Vienna." Journal of Cultural Economics 18.3 (1994): 171–198. online
 
 
  (first published by Chapman and Hall in 1845).
 
 Keefe, Simon P. Mozart (Routledge, 2018).
 Keefe, Simon P., ed. Mozart in Context (Cambridge University Press, 2018).
 Marshall, Robert Lewis. Bach and Mozart: Essays on the Enigma of Genius (University of Rochester Press, 2019).
 
 Reisinger, Elisabeth. "The Prince and the Prodigies: On the Relations of Archduke and Elector Maximilian Franz with Mozart, Beethoven, and Haydn." Acta Musicologica 91.1 (2019): 48–70 excerpt.
 Schroeder, David. Experiencing Mozart: A Listener's Companion (Scarecrow, 2013). excerpt
 
 
 Woodfield, Ian. "The Early Reception of Mozart's Operas in London: Burney's Missed Opportunity." Eighteenth-Century Music 17.2 (2020): 201–214.

External links

 Homepage for the Salzburg Mozarteum Foundation
 
 

 Digitized documents
 
 
 
 "Mozart" Titles; Mozart as author at Google Books
 Digital Mozart Edition  (Internationale Stiftung Mozarteum)
 "Mozart" titles from Gallica 
 From the British Library
 Mozart's Thematic Catalogue
 Mozart's Musical Diary
 Background information on Mozart and the Thematic Catalogue
 Letters of Leopold Mozart und Wolfgang Amadeus Mozart  (Baden State Library)

 Sheet music
 Complete sheet music (scores) from the Neue Mozart-Ausgabe (Internationale Stiftung Mozarteum)
 Mozart scores from the Munich Digitization Center (MDZ)
 Mozart titles from the University of Rochester
 
 
 Free typeset sheet music of Mozart's works from Cantorion.org
 
 

 
1756 births
1791 deaths
18th-century Austrian people
18th-century classical composers
18th-century German composers
18th-century keyboardists
18th-century male musicians
Austrian classical pianists
Male classical pianists
Austrian Classical-period composers
Austrian Freemasons
Austrian male classical composers
Austrian opera composers
Austrian Roman Catholics
Catholic liturgical composers
Child classical musicians
Composers awarded knighthoods
Composers for pedal piano
Composers for piano
Composers from Salzburg
Composers from Vienna
Composers of masonic music
German classical pianists
German Classical-period composers
German male classical composers
German male classical pianists
German opera composers
German pianists
German Roman Catholics
Male opera composers
Musicians awarded knighthoods
Musicians from Salzburg
Organ improvisers
Pedal piano players
Roman Catholic Freemasons
String quartet composers